Mathilde von Keller (1853–1945) was a German courtier and memoir writer.

Early life
Mathilde was daughter of Count Gustav von Keller (1805-1897) and his second wife Mathilde von Grolman (1813-1900).

Court life
She served as lady-in-waiting to Empress Augusta Victoria of Schleswig-Holstein from 1881. She was her fourth cousin, once removed as both have descended from Count Johann Christian I of Solms-Baruth (1670-1726) and his wife Countess Helena Constantia Henckel von Donnersmarck (1677-1753). Alongside Countess Therese von Brockdorff (1846–1924) and Countess Claire von Gersdorff (1858-1927), she was a favorite of the Empress and together they were referred to as "The three Hallelujah Aunts". Her memoirs of her life at court have been published.

References

Sources
Mathilde Gräfin von Keller: Vierzig Jahre im Dienst der Kaiserin: Ein Kulturbild aus den Jahren 1881–1921. Koehler & Amelang, Leipzig 1935.

1853 births
1945 deaths
German ladies-in-waiting
German memoirists
Women memoirists